Munjih ibn Sahm (or Munhij) (Arabic: مُنْجِح أو منحج بن سهم) was among the deceased of the Battle of Karbala.

lineage 
Hussain ibn Ali bought the mother of Munjih as a slave from Nufil ibn Harith ibn Abd al-Muttalib. She married another slave named Sahm who was Munjih's father. Munhij himself became a servant to al-Sajjad.

When Hussain left Medina to Mecca with his family, Munjih also left Medina with his mother.

On the day of Ashura 
During the first wave of attack by the enemies of Hussain ibn Ali, ten slaves of Ali ibn Abi Talib and Hussain were martyred according to Ibn Shahr Ashub. The name of Munjih's murderer was Hassan ibn Bakr al-Hanzali. The name of Munjih is specifically stated in Ziyara al-Shuhada as a martyr in the Battle of Karbala.

References 

Husayn ibn Ali
680 deaths
People killed at the Battle of Karbala